Mohammad Afzal Khan (1815 – 7 October 1867;) was the governor of Afghan Turkestan from 1849 to 1863 and Emir of Afghanistan from May 1866 to October 1867. The oldest son of Dost Mohammad Khan, Afzal Khan was born in Kabul in 1815. His father died on 9 June 1863 followed by a civil war between Dost Mohammad Khan's sons. In May 1866 he seized power from his brother Sher Ali Khan and captured Kabul. A year later he contracted cholera and died on 7 October 1867. Following Afzal Khan's death, Mohammad Azam Khan was proclaimed Amir of Afghanistan. He was an ethnic Pashtun and belonged to the Barakzai tribe.

Mohammad Afzal Khan's third son Abdur Rahman Khan was Emir from 1880 to 1901. Afzal Khan was also responsible for the creation of Takhtapul.

See also 
 List of leaders of Afghanistan

References 

1811 births
1867 deaths
19th-century Afghan monarchs
Emirs of Afghanistan
Pashtun people
19th-century Afghan politicians
19th-century monarchs in Asia